Xin Beijing is a large container ships. The ship is owned by the Yangshan D Shipping Company.

Hull and engine
Xin Beijing was built by Samsung Heavy Industries in yard 1567 and was completed in April 2007. It is a fully cellular container ship with 9 holds, with a total carrying capacity of 9572 TEU. The ship is 337m in length and 46m across the beam. The ship type is dry cargo.

The vessel is powered by a MAN B&W 12K98MC-C engine, capable of producing 68,520 kW (93,160 hp) driving 1 propeller. This 2 stroke, 12 cylinder engine was built by Doosan Engine in Changwan. When constructed, the vessel utilized four 2,750 kW auxiliary generators.

Previous owners
China Shipping Container Lines

References 

Container ships
2007 ships